Khap is a 2011 Hindi film starring Yuvika Chaudhary, Om Puri, Govind Namdev, Manoj Pahwa, Mohnish Bahl. Directed by Ajai Sinha, the film is a socio-political drama based on the Manoj-Babli honour killing case and Khap Panchayats in villages of Haryana, Rajasthan and Uttar Pradesh, which order honour killing to prevent marriages within the same gotra.

Plot
Madhur Chaudhary (played by Mohnish Bahl) moves out of his rural home leaving his father alone after various disputes they have. Madhur re-locates to Delhi along with his wife, Komal, and daughter, Ria (played by Yuvika Chaudhary). Sixteen years later, Ria is now in college, while Madhur is an Investigator with Human Rights Department. He is asked to investigate a case in his village of alleged suicide of a couple, Veer and Surili. The locals, including the fathers of the couple, Daulat Singh and Sukhiram respectively, admit that the couple had killed themselves. After going in depth in his investigation Madhur finds out that the deaths are one of many that have taken place in a region that is still bound by Khap Panchayat. It dictates that couples cannot marry distant relatives nor can they have an inter-caste/inter-religious marriage. As he delves further into this issue, he ends up being attacked, is hospitalized and then subsequently dies. Komal and Ria move in with Madhur's father Omkar Singh Chaudhary (played by Om Puri) and eventually settle down in the village.

Omkar finds out that Ria is in love with fellow-collegian, Kush (played by Sarrtaj Gill), the son of South Africa-based Jagmohan and Saroj Mitter, and arranges their marriage. After the couple return from their honeymoon, they find themselves locked in the same inhumane customs.

Cast
 Yuvika Chaudhary as Ria Bhaduri
 Om Puri as Omkar Singh Chaudhary
 Govind Namdev as Daulat Singh
 Manoj Pahwa as Sukhiram
 Mohnish Bahl as Madhur Chaudhary
 Sarrtaj Gill as Kush J. Mitter
 Alok Nath as Professor
 Anuradha Patel as Komal Sharma
 Shammi as Masterni
 Nivedita Tiwari as Surili

Soundtrack 
"Aaina Dekha" - Shaan
"Deewangi" - Shaan, Shreya Ghoshal 
"Is Pyaar Ko Jadugari" - Shaan
"Har Ek Burai" - Vikas
"Ishq Ro Raha Hai" - Rekha Bhardwaj
"Shri Ram Jai Ram" - Gazi Khan Barna
"Tumse Bichhad Kar" - Jagjit Singh
"Yeh Wohi To Hai" - Shaan, Shreya Ghoshal
"Yeh Pyaar Kaise Kab Ho Jaaye" - Shaan, Shreya Ghoshal 
"Yeh Pyaar Kaise Kab Ho Jaaye (extended)" - Shaan, Shreya Ghoshal

See also
Khap

References

External links
 
 

2011 films
Films about the caste system in India
Indian films based on actual events
2010s Hindi-language films
Films about honor killing
Indian drama films
2011 drama films
Hindi-language drama films
Drama films based on actual events